Lotte Kiærskou (born 23 June 1975) is a Danish former team handball player, and twice Olympic champion. She won a gold medal with the Danish national team at the 2000 Summer Olympics in Sydney, and the 2004 Summer Olympics in Athens.

Kiærskou is openly lesbian. She met fellow handballer Rikke Skov as teammates for Viborg HK, and "never had any thought to keep their relationship secret." They were in a registered partnership as allowed by Danish law. but split in 2011. Lotte, now retired, she works as a teacher in a school in Viborg gave birth to the ex-couple’s two daughters (Caroline in 2006, and Anna in 2008).

References

External links

1975 births
Living people
Danish female handball players
Olympic gold medalists for Denmark
LGBT handball players
Danish LGBT sportspeople
Danish lesbians
Handball players at the 2000 Summer Olympics
Handball players at the 2004 Summer Olympics
People from Frederikshavn
Viborg HK players
Olympic medalists in handball
Medalists at the 2004 Summer Olympics
Medalists at the 2000 Summer Olympics
Lesbian sportswomen
Frederikshavn fI players
Sportspeople from the North Jutland Region